Rajarengan "Rengan" Rajaratnam (born 1971) is a hedge fund manager. He is the founder of hedge fund Sedna Capital and the younger brother of convicted hedge fund founder Raj Rajaratnam. He was arrested for securities fraud in March 2013. His trial in New York City began in June, 2014 but he was found not guilty by the jury in July 2014.

Early life and education
Rajaratnam was born in Sri Lanka. Rajaratnam has an older brother, Raj, and a younger brother, Ragakanthan.

He attended the University of Pennsylvania and later graduated Stanford Graduate School of Business with an MBA in 1998.

Career

After graduating Stanford, Rajaratnam worked at Morgan Stanley and for a year at SAC Capital Advisors, founded by Steven A. Cohen. He left to run his own hedge fund, Sedna Capital, before joining the Galleon Group.

Insider trading allegations
Rajaratnam was arrested in 2013 on insider trading charges. The Galleon Group insider trading investigation began with the investigation of Sedna Capital in 2003-2004. Prosecutors alleged that Rengan Rajaratnam regularly shared confidential information with his brother, Raj Rajaratnam but he was cleared by a jury in July 2014.

During Raj Rajaratnam's trial, the jury heard Rengan Rajaratnam call former classmate and McKinsey junior partner David Palecek "a little dirty" and "boasted that he [Palecek] 'finally spilled his beans' by sharing corporate secrets." According to Bloomberg, when asked about AMD, Palecek allegedly said "Buy it, buy as much as you can as soon as you can."

Rengan Rajaratnam's own trial began before U.S. District Court Judge Naomi Reice Buchwald in June 2014. He was "accused of trading on confidential information related to wireless broadband company Clearwire Corp. and chip maker Advanced Micro Devices Inc. in 2008" while at Galleon. He was said to have acted on information from his brother and profits from the trades were alleged to be about $800,000. He was found not guilty in July 2014, after one day of jury deliberation on the one of the original six counts of the indictment for which he was tried.

References

External links
 Third McKinsey partner named in insider trading trial
 Jury Hears Dozen Taped Calls at Galleon Trial

1971 births
American hedge fund managers
Living people